The men's 50 m freestyle swimming event at the 2015 European Games took place on 27 June at the Aquatic Palace in Baku.

Results

Heats
The heats were started at 09:30.

Semifinals
The semifinals was started at 17:30.

Semifinal 1

Semifinal 2

Final
The final was held at 19:06.

References

Men's 50 metre freestyle